Zombie Zombie are a French electropop duo. Their work includes  re-interpretations of the music of John Carpenter and Sun Ra. Their performances include classic electronic instruments such as the Theremin.

Zombie Zombie performed a live soundtrack to Battleship Potemkin open air on the back of a tug boat in the Jersey Harbour as part of the Branchage Film Festival in September 2010.

Air time 
The band have been played by Gideon Coe, Tom Ravenscroft, Joe Cornish and Iggy Pop on BBC 6 Music.

External links 
 Zombie Zombie Discography on Discogs
 Zombie Zombie review on the BBC

Musical groups established in 2006
French electronic music groups
Experimental musical groups
French musical duos